The 2021 Valencia ePrix (formally the 2021 DHL Valencia E-Prix) was a pair of Formula E electric car races held at the Circuit Ricardo Tormo in the town of Cheste near Valencia, Spain on 24 and 25 April 2021. Having previously hosted numerous pre-season tests, this was the inaugural running of a competitive Formula E event at the track, as well as the first time an ePrix was held in Spain. It marked the fifth and sixth rounds of the 2020–21 Formula E season. The first race was won by Nyck de Vries, with Nico Müller and Stoffel Vandoorne rounding out the podium. Jake Dennis took his first Formula E victory in the second race, finishing ahead of André Lotterer and Alex Lynn.

Classification

Race one

Qualifying

Notes:
  – Nyck de Vries received a 5-place grid penalty for causing a collision in the previous race in Rome.
  – Stoffel Vandoorne originally qualified first with a 1:26.839 in the group stage and a 1:26.494 in the superpole, but later had all his lap times cancelled due to a tyre infringement.

Race

Notes:
  – Fastest lap.
  – Pole position.
  – Fastest in group stage.
  – Stoffel Vandoorne received a 5-second time penalty for forcing another car off the track, and a further post-race 10-second time penalty for failing to fulfil the total amount of time of his second attack mode.
  – Lucas di Grassi received a post-race drive-through penalty converted into a 30-second time penalty for failing to activate the second of the two mandatory attack modes.
  – Both NIO drivers pulled into the pit lane at the end of the final lap after exceeding the maximum energy usage. As they did not cross the chequered flag, they were not classified.
  – Rowland, Sims, da Costa, Lynn and Bird originally finished 2nd, 3rd, 9th, 10th and 11th respectively, but were disqualified from the race due to their energy used being over the regulatory limit.

Standings after the race

Drivers' Championship standings

Teams' Championship standings

 Notes: Only the top five positions are included for both sets of standings.

Race two

Qualifying

Notes:
  – André Lotterer and Mitch Evans received a 3-place grid penalty each for causing a collision in race one.

Race

Notes:
  – Pole position; fastest in group stage.
  – Fastest lap.
  – Norman Nato received a 5-second time penalty for causing a collision.

Standings after the race

Drivers' Championship standings

Teams' Championship standings

 Notes: Only the top five positions are included for both sets of standings.

Controversy 
The ending of the first race caused controversy after roughly half of the field ran out of power at the end with five cars being disqualified and two retiring for this reason. Frédéric Bertrand, circuit championships director of the FIA, said after the race that the finish of the race "demonstrated how difficult it was to win in Formula E", yet conceded that it should "never happen again". His comments were blasted by da Costa, one of the drivers disqualified for energy use, who stated that Formula E would become the "joke of the week" following that finish. Despite this the FIA stood by its energy management rules and race winner Nyck de Vries said that Formula E is "not necessarily" at fault.

Notes

References

|- style="text-align:center"
|width="35%"|Previous race:2021 Rome ePrix
|width="30%"|FIA Formula E World Championship2020–21 season
|width="35%"|Next race:2021 Monaco ePrix
|- style="text-align:center"
|width="35%"|Previous race:N/A
|width="30%"|Valencia ePrix
|width="35%"|Next race:N/A
|- style="text-align:center"

2021
2020–21 Formula E season
2021 in Spanish motorsport
April 2021 sports events in Spain
2021